Statistics of Allsvenskan in season 1932/1933.

Overview
The league was contested by 12 teams, with Hälsingborgs IF winning the championship.

League table

Results

Footnotes

References 

Allsvenskan seasons
1932–33 in Swedish association football leagues
Sweden